MPAA (4-Mercaptophenylacetic acid) is a redox buffer that increases the folding rate of disulfide-containing proteins.

MPAA is also used in native chemical ligation as a thiol catalyst.

Acetic acids
Aromatic compounds
Thiols